The three Maine-class battleships—, and —were built at the turn of the 20th century for the United States Navy. Based on the preceding , they incorporated several significant technological advances over the earlier ships. They were the first American battleships to incorporate Krupp cemented armor, which was stronger than Harvey armor, smokeless powder, which allowed for higher-velocity guns and water-tube boilers, which were more efficient and lighter.

The three Maine-class battleships served in a variety of roles throughout their careers. Maine and Missouri remained in the Atlantic Fleet for their careers, though Ohio initially served with the Asiatic Fleet from 1904 to 1907. All three ships took part in the cruise of the Great White Fleet in 1907–1909, though Maines excessive coal consumption forced her to proceed independently for most of the voyage. Missouri was used as a training ship for much of the rest of her career, and Ohio took part in the American intervention in the Mexican Revolution in 1914. All three ships were employed as training ships during World War I. After the war, all three ships were withdrawn from service between 1919 and 1920 before being sold for scrap in 1922 and 1923 and broken up.

Design 

By 1897, the US Navy had five battleships under construction, and no plans to request additional units for 1898. With the destruction of the armored cruiser  in Havana harbor and the subsequent declaration of war on Spain on 25 April 1898, however, a large naval expansion program was passed through Congress. The program called for three new battleships, the first of which would be named for the destroyed Maine. Design work began immediately, though the broad parameters for the new battleships proved to be contentious. Additionally, they pointed out that 8 in guns could not be incorporated within the displacement limit.

Several important technological advances had become available by this time, however, which necessitated several changes to the design. The advent of smokeless powder permitted smaller guns with greater muzzle velocities; the Navy had accordingly designed a 12-inch (305 mm) 40-caliber high-velocity gun. In addition, Krupp cemented armor had been developed in Germany; the steel was a significant improvement over the older Harvey process. Since the steel was stronger, thinner armor plating could achieve the same level of protection and more importantly, significant savings in weight. Water-tube boilers were also now sufficiently reliable for use in warships. These were lighter and substantially more efficient than older fire-tube boilers.

The Navy requested that the shipyards submitting designs for the contract increase the speed of their proposed ships to match the Russian vessel. Ultimately, the Newport design was chosen for the new ships.

General characteristics and machinery

They had a forecastle deck that extended to the main mast. As built, they were fitted with heavy military masts with fighting tops, but these were replaced by cage masts in 1909. They had a crew of 40 officers and 521 enlisted men, which increased to 779–813 officers and men.

Steam was provided by twelve coal-fired Thornycroft boilers for Missouri and Ohio, and twenty-four Niclausse boilers for Maine, which were trunked into three tall funnels amidships.

Armament

The ships were armed with a main battery of four 12-inch/40 caliber Mark 3 guns in two twin gun turrets on the centerline, one forward and aft. The turrets were Mark IV mounts, which required the guns to be horizontal to be reloaded. These mounts could elevate to 15 degrees and depress to -5 degrees, and they were electrically operated, and the guns could be operated independently.

The secondary battery consisted of sixteen 6-inch/50 caliber Mark 6 guns, which were placed in casemates in the hull. Ten were mounted in a battery on the upper deck, four more were located in another battery directly above on the forecastle deck, and the last two were placed in sponsoned casemates in the bow. For close-range defense against torpedo boats, they carried six /50 caliber guns mounted in casemates along the side of the hull, eight 3-pounder guns, and six 1-pounder guns. As was standard for capital ships of the period, the Maine-class battleships carried two  torpedo tubes, submerged in her hull on the broadside.

Armor
The ships' armor consisted of both Krupp cemented and Harvey steel. The deck was increased to 4 in at the stern. The main battery gun turrets had 12 in thick faces, and the supporting barbettes had the same thickness of armor plating on their exposed sides.  thick bulkheads connected the belt with the barbettes; behind these, the barbettes were protected with 8 in of steel. Armor that was 6 in thick protected the secondary battery.

Construction

Service history

After Maine and Missouri entered service, they were assigned to the North Atlantic Fleet, while Ohio, built on the West Coast of the United States, was instead sent to serve as the flagship of the Asiatic Fleet based in the Philippines. In April 1904, a turret fire killed 36 men aboard Missouri, but the quick action of three men prevented the fire from reaching the magazines and destroying the ship, for which they were awarded the Medal of Honor. In 1907, Ohio returned from the western Pacific and joined her sisters in what was now the Atlantic Fleet. During this period, Maine served as the flagship of the Atlantic Fleet until she was relieved in April 1907.

In December 1907, the three ships and the other battleships in the Atlantic Fleet steamed out of Hampton Roads, Virginia, at the start of the cruise of the Great White Fleet. The fleet steamed south, around South America and back north to the US west coast. Maine was detached owing to her excessive use of coal along with the battleship ; the two ships continued the journey independently and on a greatly shortened itinerary. The rest of the ships then crossed the Pacific and stopped in Australia, the Philippines, and Japan before continuing on through the Indian Ocean. They transited the Suez Canal and toured the Mediterranean before crossing the Atlantic, arriving bank in Hampton Roads on 22 February 1909 for a naval review with President Theodore Roosevelt.

Over the following six years, the ships had fairly uneventful careers. Missouri spent most of the time out of active service, only recommissioning for summer training cruises with midshipmen from the US Naval Academy. In 1914, Ohio was sent to Mexican waters to protect American interests in the country during the Mexican Revolution. After the United States entered World War I by declaring war on Germany on 6 April 1917, all three ships were used to train naval recruits for the expanding wartime fleet. Following the German surrender in November 1918, Missouri was used to ferry American soldiers back from France, though the other two vessels were not so employed, since their short range and lack of sufficient accommodations would have made them inefficient transports. The three ships remained in active service only very briefly after the war. Ohio was decommissioned in January 1919 and Missouri and Maine followed in September 1919 and May 1920, respectively. All three ships were sold for scrap, with Maine and Missouri going to the breakers' yard in January 1922 and Ohio joining them in March 1923.

Footnotes

Notes

Citations

References

Further reading
 
 
 

Battleship classes
 
Maine class battleship